Linqing is a county-level city under the administration of the prefecture-level city of Liaocheng in western Shandong Province, China.

Geography and climate 

It is located north-northwest of Liaocheng. The city is situated at the confluence of the Wei River and the Grand Canal.
There are 205 frost-free days per year on average and the average annual sunshine is 2661 hours.

History and economy 
Linqing has played an important role in the history of China. In Ming and Qing times it was a great center for the distribution of textiles, grain and bricks and is also famous as the place where the tiles of the Great Wall and the Forbidden City were produced. Today the city's flourishing economy is based on a number of light industrial enterprises.

Aside from the Grand Canal, sights include a distinctive promontory, a stupa, a Ming-dynasty Hui mosques (Linqing Northern Mosque, Linqing Eastern Mosque), and ruins of the old customs house, Linqing City Museum (in a historical building ensemble known as the ). In particular, the Sheli Pagoda near the Grand Canal is a well-known local landmark.

Administrative divisions
As 2012, this city is divided to four subdistricts, eight towns and three townships.
Subdistricts

Towns

Townships
Jinhaozhuang Township
Daiwan Township
Shangdian Township

Population

Demographics 
The city proper has about  residents (January 2000), whereas Linqing as a whole had  inhabitants in 1999.

Ecclesiastical history 
Once visited by the missionary and sinologist Matteo Ricci, Linqing has been the seat of a Latin Catholic Mission sui juris of Linqing / Lintsing since it was split off from the Apostolic Vicariate of Tsinanfu on 24 June 1927.
 
It was promoted to Apostolic prefecture of Linqing / Lintsing / Lintsingen(sis) (Latin) (pre-diocesan jurisdiction, not entitled to a titular bishop) on 5 April 1931.
 
It remains exempt, i.e. directly dependent on the Holy See and its missionary Roman Congregation for the Evangelization of Peoples. The see has been vacant, without Apostolic administrator, since the third incumbent's death in 1981.

Ordinaries 
(all Latin Rite) 
Ecclesiastical Superior(s)
none availableApostolic Prefects''
(Chinese secular priests)
 Father Gaspar Hu Xiu-shen (1931.03.30 – retired 1940), died 1945
 Fr. Joseph Li Chao-gui (1940.11.22 – death 1948)
 Fr. Paul Li Ben-liang (1949.11.18 – death 1981)

Notable natives 
 Ming dynasty poet Xie Zhen
 National Revolution Army general Zhang Zizhong
 Indologist, linguist, paleographer, historian and writer Ji Xianlin

See also 
 List of Catholic dioceses in China

References

Sources and external links 
 Article on Linqing from China Today, no.78 (2005)
 Official website of Linqing city government (in Chinese)
 GCatholic Catholic missionary jurisdictions
 Another Linqing site (in Chinese), but with pictures

Cities in Shandong
County-level divisions of Shandong
Liaocheng